Gilmanton is the name of several places in the United States:

Gilmanton, New Hampshire
Gilmanton, Wisconsin, a town in Buffalo County
Gilmanton (community), Wisconsin, an unincorporated community in the town of Gilmanton
Gilmanton Township, Benton County, Minnesota